Uwe Johnson (20 July 1934 – 22 February 1984) was a German writer, editor, and scholar.

Life 

Johnson was born in Kammin in Pomerania (now Kamień Pomorski, Poland). His father was a peasant of Swedish descent  from Mecklenburg and his mother was from Pomerania. In 1945 the family fled to Anklam in West Pomerania and in 1946 his father died in a Soviet internment camp (Fünfeichen). The family eventually settled in Güstrow, where he attended the John Brinckman-Oberschule from 1948 to 1952. He went on to study German philology, first in Rostock (1952–1954), then in Leipzig (1954–1956). His Diplomarbeit (final thesis) was on Ernst Barlach. Due to his failure to show support for the Communist regime of East Germany, he was suspended from the university on 17 June 1953, but he was later reinstated.

Beginning in 1953, Johnson worked on his first novel, Ingrid Babendererde, which was rejected by various publishing houses and remained unpublished during his lifetime.

In 1956, Johnson's mother left for West Berlin. As a result, he was not allowed to take a normal job in the East. Unemployed for political reasons, he translated Herman Melville's Israel Potter: His Fifty Years of Exile (the translation was published in 1961) and began to write the novel Mutmassungen über Jakob, published in 1959 by Suhrkamp in Frankfurt am Main. Johnson himself moved to West Berlin at this time. He promptly became associated with Gruppe 47, which Hans Magnus Enzensberger once described as "the Central Café of a literature without a capital".

During the early 1960s, Johnson continued to write and publish fiction, and also supported himself  as a translator, mainly from English, and as an editor. He travelled to America in 1961. The following year he was married, had a daughter, received a scholarship to Villa Massimo, Rome, and won the Prix International.

In 1964 he wrote reviews for the Tagesspiegel of television programmes broadcast from East Germany, published later under the title Der 5. Kanal [The Fifth Channel], 1987). In the same year he also published a collection of stories, Karsch, und andere Prosa (Karsch, and Other Prose), and, two years later, Zwei Ansichten (Two Views).

In 1965, Johnson travelled again to the United States. He then edited Bertolt Brecht's Me-ti. Buch der Wendungen. Fragmente 1933-1956 (Me-ti: the Book of Changes. Fragments, 1933-1956). From 1966 to 1968, he worked in New York City as a textbook editor at Harcourt, Brace & World, and lived with his wife and their daughter in an apartment at 243 Riverside Drive (Manhattan). In 1967, he began work on his magnum opus, Jahrestage. and edited  Das neue Fenster (The New Window), a textbook of German-language readings for English-speaking students learning German.

In February 1967, the Kommune 1 moved into Johnson's apartment building in West Berlin. He first learned about in a newspaper report about a plan for a "pudding attack" on the U.S. Vice-President Hubert Humphrey. 

Returning to West Germany in 1969, Johnson became a member of both its PEN Center and its Akademie der Künste (Academy of the Arts). In 1970, he published the first volume of his Jahrestage (Anniversaries). Two more volumes were to follow in the next three years, but the fourth volume did not appear until 1983.

In 1972, Johnson became Vice President of the Academy of the Arts and edited Max Frisch's Tagebuch 1966-1971. 

In 1974, Johnson, his wife and their daughter moved into 26 Marine Parade, a Victorian terrace house overlooking the sea in Sheerness on the Isle of Sheppey in Southeast England. Shortly afterwards, he broke off work on Jahrestage, due partly to health problems and partly to writer's block. However, his ten years in Sheerness were not completely unproductive. He published some shorter works and continued to do some work as an editor. In 2020, a monograph by cultural historian Patrick Wright, The Sea View Has Me Again, was published by Repeater Books, focusing on Johnson's decade living in Sheerness. 

In 1977, he was admitted to the Darmstädter Akademie für Sprache und Dichtung (Darmstadt Academy for Speech and Writing). Two years later he informally withdrew. 

In 1979, he gave a series of lectures on poetics at the University of Frankfurt, published posthumously as Begleitumstände. Frankfurter Vorlesungen.

In 1983, the fourth volume of Jahrestage was published, but Johnson broke off a reading tour for health reasons. He died from hypertensive heart disease in Sheerness on 22 February 1984. His body was not found until 13 March. At the time of his death, he had been planning a one-year stay in New York City.

Marriage
On 27 February 1962, Johnson married Elisabeth Schmidt, who he later (1975) accused of conducting a love affair with the Czech Mozart scholar Tomislav Volek.

Honors
 1960 – Fontane Prize, West Berlin
 1962 – Prix International, awarded by the Formentor Group
 1971 – Georg Büchner Prize
 1975 – Wilhelm Raabe Prize, Braunschweig
 1978 – Thomas Mann Prize, Lübeck
 1983 – Literature prize from the city of Cologne

Works 
Mutmassungen über Jakob (1959). Speculations About Jakob, trans. Ursule Molinaro (Grove, 1963)
 Das dritte Buch über Achim (1961). The Third Book About Achim, trans. Ursule Molinaro (1967)
 Karsch, und andere Prosa (1964). Karsch and Other Prose
 Includes "Eine Reise wegwohin" (written in 1960). An Absence, trans. Richard and Clara Winston (1969)
 Zwei Ansichten (1965). Two Views, trans. Richard and Clara Winston (1966)
 Jahrestage. Aus dem Leben von Gesine Cresspahl (1970–83). Anniversaries: From a Year in the Life of Gesine Cresspahl, trans. Damion Searls (2018)
 Eine Reise nach Klagenfurt (1974). A Trip to Klagenfurt: In the Footsteps of Ingeborg Bachmann, trans. Damion Searls (2004)
 Berliner Sachen, Aufsätze (1975). Berlin Things: Essays
 Max Frisch Stich-Worte (1975). Max Frisch Reference
 Skizze eines Verunglückten (1982). Sketch of an Accident Victim
 Begleitumstände. Frankfurter Vorlesungen (1980). Attendant Circumstances: Frankfurt Lectures
 Ingrid Babendererde. Reifeprüfung 1953 (1985). Ingrid Babendererde: Final Exam 1953
Inselgeschichten (1995). Island Stories: Writings from England, trans. Damion Searls (forthcoming)

As translator 

Translation of Herman Melville's Israel Potter: His Fifty Years of Exile (1961)
 Translation of Das Nibelungenlied from Middle High German (1961)
 Translation of John Knowles's A Separate Peace (1959) as In diesem Land (1963)

As editor 

 Edition of Bertolt Brecht's Me-ti. Buch der Wendungen. Fragmente 1933-1956 (Me-ti: the Book of Changes. Fragments, 1933-1956) (1965)
 Das neue Fenster, a textbook of German-language readings for foreign students (1967)
 Textbook for the documentary film "A Summer in the City" (1968?)
 Co-editor with Hans Mayer, Das Werk von Samuel Beckett. Berliner Colloquium (1975, The Work of Samuel Beckett: Berlin Colloquium)

Short pieces 

 Von dem Fischer un syner Fru (Of the Fisherman and His Wife; the German-language title is in dialect): a fairy tale by Philipp Otto Runge with seven pictures by Marcus Behmer, and a retelling and afterword by Uwe Johnson (1976)
 "Ein Schiff" ("A Ship") in Jürgen Habermas (ed.), Stichworte zur "Geistigen Situation der Zeit" (References on "The Spiritual Situation of the Time") (1979)
 "Ein unergründliches Schiff" ("An Unfathomable Ship") in Merkur 33 (1979)

References

Further reading 

 Raimund Fellinger (ed.), Über Uwe Johnson, Frankfurt am Main, 1992

 Rainer Gerlach and Matthias Richter (ed.), Uwe Johnson, Frankfurt am Main, 1984
 Grambow, Jürgen, Uwe Johnson, Reinbek bei Hamburg, 1997
 Augustinus P. Dierick: "The Nexus of Biography and Politics in Uwe Johnson's Das dritte Buch über Achim (1961).
	Neophilologus, vol. XCIX, no. 4 (2015), 617-630.

External links

  (non-profit society dedicated to Johnson's life and work)
  (digital edition of his work, accessible online)
  (collection of links)
 

German people of Swedish descent
1934 births
1984 deaths
People from Kamień Pomorski
People from Sheerness
German scholars
East German writers
People from the Province of Pomerania
Leipzig University alumni
University of Rostock alumni
Georg Büchner Prize winners
German male writers